Al-Masfiwi was a poet in the time of Ahmad al-Mansur. The surviving poetry of al-Masfiwi can be found in Manahil al-Safa, as well as in  Kitab al-Istiqsa li-akhbar duwal al-Maghrib al-Aqsa by the nineteenth-century Moroccan historian, Abu al-Abbas Ahmad ibn Khalid al-Nasiri al-Salawi.  The section on Ahmad al-Mansur is found in Volume Five of this work.  This volume has been translated into French by al-Nasiri's son, Muhammad al-Nasiri, and appears in Archives Marocaines 34 (1936).

References

16th-century Moroccan poets
16th-century Moroccan writers
People from Safi, Morocco
16th-century Moroccan people
17th-century Moroccan poets
17th-century Moroccan writers